The Wishmas Tree is a 2019 Australian 3D computer-animated adventure film written and directed by Ricard Cussó from a story by Peter Ivan. Financed by Screen Queensland and Screen Australia, it is the first film in Like a Photon Creative's The Tales from Sanctuary City franchise. The film stars Miranda Tapsell and Ross Noble. It had its world premiere at the Brisbane International Film Festival on 5 October 2019, and was released in Australian cinemas on 27 February 2020.

Premise 
A young possum's misguided wish for a white Wishmas freezes her entire hometown of Sanctuary City and threatens the lives of all who live there. Before the magical Wishmas Tree dies, she must undertake a journey into The Wild in order to reverse the damage she caused and save the city.

Cast 
Miranda Tapsell as Kerry
Ross Noble as Yarra
Kate Murphy as Petra and Bernard the Drop Bear
Ricard Cussó as Augustus 
Ryan Renshaw as Kerry and Petra's father

Release and reception 
The film had its world premiere at the Brisbane International Film Festival on 5 October 2019. It had a limited release, and grossed $874,049 worldwide. It was distributed theatrically by R & R Films in Australia and New Zealand, and by various other companies internationally and on home media.

The film received generally negative reviews from critics, and on review aggregator Rotten Tomatoes the film holds an approval rating of  based on  reviews.

References

External links 

The Tales from Sanctuary City
2019 films
2019 computer-animated films
2010s children's animated films
2010s Australian animated films
Australian children's films
Australian children's animated films
Australian computer-animated films
2010s English-language films
Screen Australia films
Australian animated feature films